More Bones: Scary Stories From Around The World is a book of children's short stories from around the world. The stories were selected and retold by Arielle North Olson and Howard Schwartz, with illustrations by E.M. Gist.

It has been reviewed by Kirkus Reviews.

References

Children's short story collections